The Upper Yarra Reservoir is located east of Melbourne, Victoria, Australia, beyond Warburton within the locality of Reefton. Water from Upper Yarra Reservoir supplies towns in the upper Yarra Valley, and Silvan Reservoir, which transfers water to most parts of Melbourne.

The management of 157,000 hectares of Melbourne's forested water catchments of the Upper Yarra such as the Watts (Maroondah) were vested in the Melbourne and Metropolitan Board of Works (MMBW) in 1891. In 1928, the Upper Yarra catchment was permanently added for water supply purposes.

Approval to construct Upper Yarra Reservoir was granted in the early 1940s but due to World War II work did not start until 1948. When the Upper Yarra Reservoir was completed the total storage capacity of Melbourne's system was tripled to nearly 300,000 megalitres.

Upper Yarra Reservoir is also supplied by water transferred from the Thomson River Dam.

As of January 2007, severe drought in south-eastern Australia had resulted in low water levels in the reservoir, which on 5 January 2007 was approximately half full. As of 22 July 2013, it contained 95,568 megalitres of water(47.6% full). The recorded water storage level in the dam in 26 September 2021 was 186,060 megalitres, equivalent to being 92.8 per cent full.

See also
John L. Savage – an American engineer who consulted on the construction of the dam
Albert Francis Ronalds – Engineer-in-Chief of the Board of Works during construction of the dam

References 

Reservoirs in Victoria (Australia)
Dams in Victoria (Australia)
Melbourne Water catchment
Rivers of Greater Melbourne (region)
Yarra River
Yarra Valley
Dams completed in 1957
Embankment dams
1957 establishments in Australia